Jesmyn Ward (born April 1, 1977) is an American novelist and a Professor of English at Tulane University, where she holds the Andrew W. Mellon Professorship in the Humanities. She won the 2011 National Book Award for Fiction for her second novel Salvage the Bones and won the 2017 National Book Award for Fiction for her novel Sing, Unburied, Sing. She also received a 2012 Alex Award for the story about familial love and community in facing  Hurricane Katrina. She is the only woman and only African American to win the National Book Award for Fiction twice. All three of Ward's novels are set in the fictitious Mississippi town of Bois Sauvage.

Early life and education
Jesmyn Ward was born in 1977 in Berkeley, California. She moved to DeLisle, Mississippi, with her family at the age of three. She developed a love-hate relationship with her hometown after having been bullied by classmates both at public school and while attending a private school paid for by her mother's employer.

The first in her family to attend college, she earned a B.A. in English, in 1999, and an M.A. in media studies and communication, in 2000, both at Stanford University. Ward chose to become a writer to honor the memory of her younger brother, who was killed by a drunk driver in October 2000, just after Ward had completed her master's degree.

In 2005, Ward received her MFA in Creative Writing from the University of Michigan. Shortly afterwards, she and her family became victims of Hurricane Katrina. With their house in DeLisle flooding rapidly, the Ward family set out in their car to get to a local church, but ended up stranded in a field full of tractors. When the owners of the land eventually checked on their possessions, they refused to invite the Wards into their home, claiming they were overcrowded. Tired and traumatized, the family was eventually given shelter by another family down the road.

Ward went on to work at the University of New Orleans, where her daily commute took her through the neighborhoods ravaged by the hurricane. Empathizing with the struggle of the survivors and coming to terms with her own experience during the storm, Ward was unable to write creatively for three years – the time it took her to find a publisher for her first novel, Where the Line Bleeds.

Career
In 2008, just as Ward had decided to give up writing and enroll in a nursing program, Where the Line Bleeds was accepted by Doug Seibold at Agate Publishing. The novel was picked as a Book Club Selection by Essence magazine and received a Black Caucus of the American Library Association (BCALA) Honor Award in 2009. It was shortlisted for the Virginia Commonwealth University Cabell First Novelist Award and the Hurston-Wright Legacy Award. Starting on the day twin protagonists Joshua and Christophe DeLisle graduate from high school, Where the Line Bleeds follows the brothers as their choices pull them in opposite directions. Unwilling to leave the small rural town on the Gulf Coast where they were raised by their loving grandmother, the twins struggle to find work, with Joshua eventually becoming a dock hand and Christophe joining his drug-dealing cousin. In a starred review, Publishers Weekly called Ward "a fresh new voice in American literature" who "unflinchingly describes a world full of despair but not devoid of hope."

In her second novel, Salvage the Bones, Ward homes in once more on the visceral bond between poor black siblings growing up on the Gulf Coast. Chronicling the lives of pregnant teenager Esch Batiste, her three brothers, and their father during the 10 days leading up to Hurricane Katrina, the day of the storm, and the day after, Ward uses a vibrant language steeped in metaphors to illuminate the fundamental aspects of love, friendship, passion, and tenderness. Explaining her main character's fascination with the Greek mythological figure of Medea, Ward told Elizabeth Hoover of The Paris Review: "It infuriates me that the work of white American writers can be universal and lay claim to classic texts, while black and female authors are ghetto-ized as 'other.' I wanted to align Esch with that classic text, with the universal figure of Medea, the antihero, to claim that tradition as part of my Western literary heritage. The stories I write are particular to my community and my people, which means the details are particular to our circumstances, but the larger story of the survivor, the savage, is essentially a universal, 123456789 human one."

On November 16, 2011, Ward won the National Book Award for Fiction for Salvage the Bones. Interviewed by CNN's Ed Lavandera on November 16, 2011, she said that both her nomination and her victory had come as a surprise, given that the novel had been largely ignored by mainstream reviewers. "When I hear people talking about the fact that they think we live in a post-racial America, … it blows my mind, because I don't know that place. I've never lived there. … If one day, … they're able to pick up my work and read it and see … the characters in my books as human beings and feel for them, then I think that that is a political act", Ward stated in a television interview with Anna Bressanin of BBC News on December 22, 2011.

Ward received an Alex Award for Salvage the Bones on January 23, 2012. The Alex Awards are given out each year by the Young Adult Library Services Association to ten books written for adults that resonate strongly with young people aged 12–18. Commenting on the winning books in School Library Journal, former Alex Award committee chair, Angela Carstensen described Salvage the Bones as a novel with "a small but intense following – each reader has passed the book to a friend."

Prior to her appointment at Tulane, Ward was an assistant professor of creative writing at the University of South Alabama. From 2008 to 2010, Ward had a Stegner Fellowship at Stanford University. She was the John and Renée Grisham Writer in Residence at the University of Mississippi for the 2010–2011 academic year.<ref name=OleMiss>English Department. "John and Renée Grisham Writers in Residence" , University of Mississippi.</ref> Ward joined the faculty at Tulane in the fall of 2014. In 2013, she released her memoir Men We Reaped. In 2017, she was the recipient of a MacArthur "genius grant" from the John D. and Catherine T. MacArthur Foundation. That same year, she received a second National Book Award for her third novel, Sing, Unburied, Sing, which made her the first woman to win two National Book Awards for Fiction. The novel also won an Anisfield-Wolf Book Award.

In July 2011, Ward wrote that she had finished the first draft of her third book, calling it the hardest thing she had ever written. It was a memoir titled Men We Reaped and was published in 2013. The book explores the lives of her brother and four other young black men who lost their lives in her hometown.

In August 2016, Simon & Schuster released The Fire This Time: A New Generation Speaks about Race, edited by Ward. The book takes as its starting point James Baldwin's The Fire Next Time, his classic 1963 examination of race in America. Contributors to The Fire This Time include Carol Anderson, Jericho Brown, Garnett Cadogan, Edwidge Danticat, Rachel Kaadzi Ghansah, Mitchell S. Jackson, Honoree Jeffers, Kima Jones, Kiese Laymon, Daniel José Older, Emily Raboteau, Claudia Rankine, Clint Smith, Natasha Trethewey, Wendy S. Walters, Isabel Wilkerson, Kevin Young, and Jesmyn Ward herself.

Her third novel, Sing, Unburied, Sing, was released in 2017 and met with several effusive reviews, winning the 2017 National Book Award for fiction.Paula Rogo, "Jesmyn Ward Wins Second National Book Award for 'Sing, Unburied, Sing'" , Essence, November 18, 2017. Set in Ward's fictitious Mississippi town, Bois Sauvage, the novel is narrated from three perspectives mainly within a rural family. Jojo, a young African-American boy, navigates a maturation from childhood to adulthood. His mother, Leonie, struggles with addiction and the challenges of raising children. Finally, Richie, a wayward ghost from the Mississippi State Penitentiary, haunts Jojo and pleads with his family to help him find closure on his death. This story consists of a car ride to a penitentiary where Leonie is picking up the father of her children. On this car ride the family endures paranormal interactions, the battle with drug addiction, how we deal with grief, and the racism and incarceration in America. Themes of family, nature, death, emotion, and racism are present within the novel as the reader follows the family during this time of their life. Song is tied within the paranormal saying that the dead have singing to do. Song within the African American culture is another connection we are able to make in this novel to reality. The grandparents being Pop and Mam are other characters within this novel, and Pop is the father figure Jojo has to learn from. Pop is teaching Jojo how to be a man as the reader is catapulted into the story.

In 2018 Ward contributed her Prologue from Men We Reaped to a special edition of Xavier Review (Vol.38. No.2), which includes a foreword by Thomas Bonner, Jr. an afterword by Robin G. Vander (both editors of the volume), a chronology, and fifteen essays by scholars, including Trudier Harris and Keith Cartwright. At the time this was the first book-length publication on Ward.

Ward is a contributor to the 2019 anthology New Daughters of Africa, edited by Margaret Busby.

In 2020, Simon & Schuster published Ward's Navigate Your Stars, adapted from a speech the author made at Tulane's 2018 commencement.

Ward's personal essay, "On Witness and Respair: A Personal Tragedy Followed by Pandemic", about the death of her husband, her grief, the spreading Covid-19 pandemic, and the resurgent Black Lives Matter movement, appeared in the September 2020 issue of Vanity Fair, guest-edited by Ta-Nehisi Coates.

The U.S. Library of Congress in 2022 selected Ward as the winner of the Library's Prize for American Fiction. At age 45, Ward is the youngest person to receive the Library’s fiction award for her lifetime of work.

Personal life
Ward lives in Mississippi and has two children. Her husband, Brandon R. Miller, died in January 2020 of an acute respiratory distress syndrome at the age of 33. Ward wrote about his death in an article for Vanity Fair.

Recognition
 2011 National Book Award Winner for Salvage the Bones 2013 National Book Critics Circle Award (Autobiography) shortlist for Men We Reaped 2017 National Book Award Winner for Sing, Unburied, Sing 2018 Anisfield-Wolf Book Award for "Sing, Unburied,Sing" 
 2018 Time 100
 2022 Library of Congress Prize for American Fiction

Works
FictionWhere the Line Bleeds (Agate Publishing, 2008)Salvage the Bones (Bloomsbury Publishing, 2011)Sing, Unburied, Sing: a novel (Scribner, 2017)

NonfictionMen We Reaped (Bloomsbury Publishing, 2013)The Fire This Time: A New Generation Speaks About Race (Simon & Schuster, 2016)Navigate Your Stars (Simon & Schuster, 2020)

References

Further reading
 "Celebrating Jesmyn Ward: Critical Readings and Scholarly Responses". Xavier Review, vol. 38, no. 2 (2018).
 Clark, Christopher. "What Comes to the Surface: Storms, Bodies, and Community in Jesmyn Ward's Salvage the Bones". Mississippi Quarterly, vol. 68, no. 3–4 (Summer–Fall 2015), pp. 341–358.
 Crownshaw, Richards. "Agency and Environment in the Work of Jesmyn Ward: Response to Anna Hartnell, 'When Cars Become Churches'", Journal of American Studies, vol. 50, no. 1 (February 2016), pp. 225–230.
 Green, Tara. "Katrina Sings the Blues in Jesmyn Ward's Salvage the Bones" in Reimagining the Middle Passage, Ohio State University Press, 2018.
 Hartnell, Anna. "When Cars Become Churches: Jesmyn Ward's Disenchanted America. An Interview". Journal of American Studies, vol. 50, no. 1 (February 2016), pp. 205–218.
 Henry, Alvin. "Jesmyn Ward’s Post-Katrina Black Feminism: Memory and Myth through Salvaging". English Language Notes, vol. 57, no. 2 (October 1, 2019), pp. 71–85.
 Kacha, Boris. "The Rise and Return of Jesmyn Ward". New York Magazine, August 24, 2017.
 Travis, Molly. "We Are Here: Jesmyn Ward's Survival Narratives Response to Anna Hartnell, 'When Cars Become Churches'". Journal of American Studies'', vol. 50, no. 1 (February 2016), pp. 219–224.

External links

Jesmyn Ward's blog
Jesmyn Ward discusses Where the Line Bleeds, YouTube
Jesmyn Ward – feature on BBC News
Jesmyn Ward at Library of Congress Authorities — with 3 catalog records

21st-century American novelists
21st-century American women writers
African-American novelists
American women novelists
21st-century American memoirists
American women memoirists
National Book Award winners
Stanford University alumni
Stegner Fellows
Novelists from Mississippi
University of Michigan alumni
University of South Alabama faculty
Living people
People from Harrison County, Mississippi
Place of birth missing (living people)
MacArthur Fellows
PEN Oakland/Josephine Miles Literary Award winners
Novelists from Alabama
1977 births
African-American memoirists
Writers from Berkeley, California
American women academics
21st-century African-American women writers
21st-century African-American people
20th-century African-American people
20th-century African-American women
21st-century African-American writers
Vanity Fair (magazine) people